Grant Lee Buffalo was an American rock band based in Los Angeles, California, United States, consisting of Grant-Lee Phillips (vocals and guitar), Paul Kimble (bass) and Joey Peters (drums). All three were previously members of another Los Angeles band, Shiva Burlesque.

Shiva Burlesque
In the late 1980s, Jeffrey Clark, Grant-Lee Phillips, James Brenner and Joey Peters started as a rock music formation called Shiva Burlesque. They released two studio albums, the self-titled Shiva Burlesque in 1987 on Nate Starkman & Son Records, and a follow-up (and final) album, Mercury Blues, which was released in 1990 on Fundamental Records. Matt Snow in Q Magazine highlighted the Doors and Echo and the Bunnymen as references and described the last album as "great late-night un-easy listening".  Paul Kimble replaced Brenner on bass and the band renamed as Grant Lee Buffalo in 1991.

Career
Grant Lee Buffalo released four albums: Fuzzy (1993), Mighty Joe Moon (1994), Copperopolis  (1996) and Jubilee (1998).  They toured with major bands including R.E.M., Pearl Jam, the Smashing Pumpkins, and The Cranberries. In the United States, the band's 1998 single, "Truly, Truly", received extensive airplay.

Paul Kimble departed the band in 1997, but Grant Lee Buffalo's next album Jubilee met with more success than the prior releases thanks to "Truly, Truly." But, as Phillips describes, a number of changes led to the dissolution of the band's time at their label and their time together.

"The celebrational spirit of Jubilee actually brought a renewed optimism to me personally. The album was well received and understandably the expectations at the label were high, probably too high. Although the highly refined Jubilee had brought the band considerable success at radio with "Truly, Truly," a shift within the industry was well underway. The label's constant nagging about "Call-out Response" was both a new term and a bewildering concept to our ears. The basic strategy: a radio station arranges to call up a listener who is asked to consume about 30 songs over the phone, perhaps 20 seconds of each. From this remote encounter, the listener will then proceed to judge the material. Insufficient call-out response was a big reason that Jubilee hardly got a shot at Warners. Grant Lee Buffalo tunes are often like an old car or an old amp that needs a few seconds to get warmed up, but when it does... look out! Meanwhile, a new crop of young record buyers, the largest since the Baby Boomer era, were now being targeted to the exclusion of Gen-Xers, like myself, still waiting for the Pixies to reform.

In 2001, a compilation of singles, album tracks and rarities called Storm Hymnal was released.

Grant Lee Buffalo's sound is comparable to Neil Young and an electrified version of Americana songwriter John Stewart. Phillips writes that their first album "would galvanize the sound of Grant Lee Buffalo, i.e., the acoustic feedback howl of overdriven 12-string guitars, melodic distorto-bass, tribal drum bombast, the old world churn of pump organs and parlor pianos."

Lyrically, they reference American history as well as contemporary events. For instance, “Lone Star Song” from Mighty Joe Moon references the Waco siege and “Crackdown” from Copperopolis references the murder of Yoshihiro Hattori as well as the Oklahoma City bombing.
In May 2011 the band returned on a limited tour, making stops in Los Angeles, Dublin, London, Brussels, Copenhagen  and Oslo. On August 8, 2011, the band performed at Dranouter festival in Belgium, and on August 9 in Copenhagen. The band also played at the German Haldern Pop Festival in August 2012.

In October 2017, Chrysalis Records acquired Grant Lee Buffalo's back catalog from Slash Records. Chrysalis/Blue Raincoat CEO Jeremy Lascelles had previously signed the band to the label's publisher in the 1990s.

Solo careers

Lead singer Phillips has had his own solo career as well. He explains:

As for Grant Lee Buffalo, I sensed they were beginning to wonder if we'd ever get through finishing school. Before that could happen, band and label parted as did Peters and myself. The scenery was changing and I was looking for new explorations. I'm sure we all were. Perhaps we always will be."

He was signed to the Boston-based indie label Rounder Records and launched a solo career, issuing Ladies' Love Oracle online in 2000. The recording was later more widely released. His first full-length album, Mobilize, was released in 2001. Phillips has released ten albums between 2000 and 2020.

Discography

Studio albums

Singles and EPs

Compilations and live albums

Music videos

Soundtracks 

(*) - Soundtrack demos only, not on the OST.

References

External links
 Grant Lee Buffalo official webpage
 h2g2 article on Grant Lee Buffalo

Alternative rock groups from California
Musical groups established in 1991
Musical groups disestablished in 1999
Musical groups from Los Angeles
1991 establishments in California